Nick Popplewell (born 6 April 1964 in Dublin) is an Irish former rugby union player who won 48 caps for his country between 1989 and 1998. He played club rugby for Greystones RFC, Wasps RFC, Newcastle Falcons, and also captained Leinster Rugby for a season. At Newcastle he made 19 appearances as they won the 1997-98 Premiership. He started all three tests for the British & Irish Lions on the tour to New Zealand in 1993, and was seen as one of the stars of the tour.

After retiring from rugby, he became an estate agent, and gained a master's degree in business studies.

References

External links
Ireland profile
 http://www.sporting-heroes.net/rugby/ireland-rugby-players-n-s/nick-popplewell-3777/irish-international-caps_a04041/

1964 births
Living people
Irish rugby union players
Ireland international rugby union players
Newcastle Falcons players
Greystones RFC players
British & Irish Lions rugby union players from Ireland
Rugby union props
Rugby union players from Dublin (city)
Irish Exiles rugby union players
People educated at Newtown School, Waterford
Irish expatriate rugby union players
Irish expatriate sportspeople in England
Expatriate rugby union players in England
People from Gorey
Rugby union players from County Wexford